Dolbina is a genus of moths in the family Sphingidae. The genus was erected by Otto Staudinger in 1877.

Species
Dolbina borneensis Brechlin, 2009
Dolbina elegans Bang-Haas 1912
Dolbina exacta Staudinger 1892
Dolbina formosana Matsumura, 1927
Dolbina grisea (Hampson 1893)
Dolbina inexacta (Walker 1856)
Dolbina krikkeni Roesler & Kuppers 1975
Dolbina luzonensis Brechlin, 2009
Dolbina mindanaensis Brechlin, 2009
Dolbina paraexacta Brechlin, 2009
Dolbina schnitzleri Cadiou 1997
Dolbina tancrei Staudinger 1887

References

 
Moth genera
Taxa named by Otto Staudinger